Ectopsocus petersi is a species of Psocoptera from the Ectopsocidae family that can be found in Great Britain and Ireland. The species are brownish-orange coloured and is similar to Ectopsocus briggsi.

Habitat
The species feed on trees such as: 
Alder
ash
Beech
Birch
Bird cherry
Blackthorn
Cherry laurel
Chinese juniper
Elm
hawthorn
Hazel
Hebe
Ivy
Juniper
Larch
Pine
Privet
Oak
Sallow
Spruce
Sycamore
Sea-buckthorn
Willow

They also feed on fruits such as apple, bramble, horse chestnut, laurel, lime, pear, and rowan. The species also don't mind to feed on plants such as rhododendron, bracket fungus and leaf litter. They are also hungry for Buxus, Chrysanthemum, and Dianthus species of plants on which they feed while flying in England.

References

Ectopsocidae
Insects described in 1978
Psocoptera of Europe